Unladen weight may refer to:
 curb weight
 Tare weight